Desert Diamond Arena (originally Glendale Arena and formerly Jobing.com Arena and Gila River Arena) is an indoor multi-purpose entertainment arena located in Glendale, Arizona. The venue anchors the 223-acre, $1 billion Westgate Entertainment District.

Owned by the City of Glendale and managed by ASM Global, Desert Diamond Arena was home to the National Hockey League’s (NHL) Arizona Coyotes (from 2003 until 2022) and currently hosts concerts and other entertainment acts throughout the year. Desert Diamond Arena has a seating capacity of 17,125 for ice hockey, 18,300 for basketball and about 19,000 for concert events. The arena has 3,075 club seats and 87 luxury suites.

History
After the original Winnipeg Jets relocated to Phoenix from Winnipeg in 1996, they spent their first 7+ seasons playing at America West Arena as the Phoenix Coyotes. Although not an old facility – it had opened as the new home of the NBA's Phoenix Suns only four years earlier – America West Arena was primarily designed for basketball and had to be quickly retrofitted for hockey. The arena floor was barely large enough to fit an NHL regulation size hockey rink and several seats on the upper level actually hung over the boards. That obstructed the views for up to 3,000 spectators. As a result, before the team's second season in Phoenix, its hockey seating capacity was cut down from 18,000+ seats to 16,210 — then the second-smallest capacity in the NHL. After the Colorado Avalanche moved from McNichols Sports Arena into the Pepsi Center in 1999 and the Toronto Maple Leafs from Maple Leaf Gardens into the Air Canada Centre later in the same season, America West Arena was the smallest NHL venue.

When the Coyotes were sold to a partnership led by Phoenix real estate developer Steve Ellman, that group committed to build a new arena in the neighboring Phoenix suburb of Glendale. With a lease agreement signed with the City of Glendale in 2001, construction began on the new facility on April 3, 2002, and the venue was officially opened midway through the 2003–04 NHL season as Glendale Arena. The National Lacrosse League's Arizona Sting hosted the very first sporting event in the new arena, a 16–12 2004 NLL season opening victory against the Vancouver Ravens on December 26, 2003. The very next evening, the Phoenix Coyotes hosted their first game before a standing room-only crowd of 19,052 in their new home, that resulting a 3–3 tie against the Nashville Predators. Their first win in Glendale was on December 31, 2003, with a 4-0 victory over the Los Angeles Kings.

On August 19, 2021, the city of Glendale chose to not renew their operating agreement for Desert Diamond Arena after the 2021–22 season, putting the franchise's future in Arizona into question. The Coyotes announced they would be seeking to build a new venue in Tempe in response.  On April 29, 2022, the Coyotes played their final home game at the arena against the Nashville Predators, with the Coyotes winning 5-4. Coyotes defenseman Shayne Gostisbehere scored the last NHL goal in the building. The Coyotes are now playing their home games at Arizona State University's Mullett Arena.

Concerts and events
Desert Diamond Arena has hosted numerous concerts and events of note since opening in December 2003. A string of concerts in the arena’s inaugural year included performances by Prince, Rod Stewart, Toby Keith, Britney Spears, and Usher. Since then, more acts have performed there including U2, RBD, Elton John, The Rolling Stones, Paul McCartney, Bruce Springsteen,  Rage Against the Machine, Billie Eilish, Kenny Chesney, Mötley Crüe, Justin Timberlake, Katy Perry, The Eagles, Taylor Swift, The Weeknd, Harry Styles, Celine Dion, Coldplay, Eric Church, Justin Bieber, Kendrick Lamar, Ed Sheeran, Shawn Mendes, Sam Smith, Bon Jovi, Khalid, Madonna, Pearl Jam, Red Hot Chili Peppers, Usher, John Mayer, Tim McGraw, Faith Hill, and For King & Country.

Desert Diamond Arena has also hosted a variety of events in recent years including UFC on Fox: Poirier vs. Gaethje, UFC 263: Adesanya vs. Vettori 2, Jake Paul vs. Anderson Silva, Nitro Circus Live, WWE SmackDown, Stars on Ice, Gold Over America Tour, Street League Skateboarding, and World Extreme Cagefighting. The arena has also hosted a number of traveling family-oriented shows including the Radio City Christmas Spectacular, Sesame Street Live, the Harlem Globetrotters and Cirque du Soleil.

Since 2005, the arena has been the host venue for the Arizona state high school basketball, volleyball, wrestling and cheerleading tournaments in an event called "February Frenzy," resulting from a formal agreement between the City of Glendale and the Arizona Interscholastic Association (AIA).

The highest grossing event in venue history was UFC 263: Adesanya vs. Vettori 2 on June 12, 2021, with 17,208 guests in attendance and $4,281,800 in revenue.

The arena was also the temporary home of the Arizona Rattlers arena/indoor football team when their home arena, the now-Footprint Center, was not available due to other events.  It hosted the Arena Football League's ArenaBowl XXIX in 2016, the Indoor Football League's playoffs in 2019 and was scheduled to host the team's IFL home season in 2020 prior to the COVID-19 pandemic in Arizona.

Prior to the 2018–19 season, the Coyotes purchased and installed the center-hung scoreboard that was formerly used by the defunct The Palace of Auburn Hills.

The arena was a regular stop for the Professional Bull Riders (PBR)’s Premier Series for several years. Since 2022, it is now the home venue of the PBR’s Arizona Ridge Riders during the PBR Team Series season held from the summer to autumn.

Naming rights
Naming rights to the arena were initially held by Jobing.com — a Phoenix-based employment website — under a ten-year, $30 million contract established in October 2006.

The Coyotes terminated their agreement with Jobing.com and then immediately announced a new nine-year naming rights and sponsorship deal on August 13, 2014 with Gila River Casinos — a group of tribal casinos that are controlled by the Gila River Indian Community. Now-former Coyotes President/CEO and Alternate Governor Anthony LeBlanc described the new agreement as the "most significant deal" made by the team under its new IceArizona ownership. With it, the Gila River community became the first federally recognized Native American tribe to hold a naming rights deal with a venue for one of the major professional sports leagues in the United States and Canada.

On August 23, 2022, the arena reached an agreement with Desert Diamond Casino to rename the arena as Desert Diamond Arena.

References

External links

Desert Diamond Arena

Boxing venues in the United States
Gymnastics venues in the United States
Music venues completed in 2003
Sports venues completed in 2003
Indoor ice hockey venues in the United States
Indoor lacrosse venues in the United States
Music venues in Arizona
Defunct National Hockey League venues
Buildings and structures in Glendale, Arizona
Sports in Glendale, Arizona
2003 establishments in Arizona
Arizona State Sun Devils men's ice hockey
Boxing in Arizona
Gila River Indian Community
Arizona Coyotes